This is a list of principal and guide meridians and base lines of the United States, with the year established and a brief summary of what areas' land surveys are based on each.

List of meridians
Primarily from the United States Government Printing Office Style Manual.  State names usually signify only parts of each listed state, unless otherwise indicated.

Based on the BLM manual's 1973 publication date, and the reference to Clarke's Spheroid of 1866 in section 2-82, coordinates appear to be in the NAD27 datum.

Principal Meridians

Guide Meridians

Ohio Lands
Some parts of the Ohio Lands (now Ohio) were laid out in survey townships, but based on other points not listed above:
 Base Line of the United States Military Survey (1797)
 Great Miami River baseline (1798)
 Ohio River (1785) — also part of Indiana
 Muskingum River baseline (1800)
 Scioto River baseline (1799)
 Twelve Mile Square Reserve (1805)

See also
 Public Land Survey System — the basis of most meridians in the United States

References